Mounteere cap (also known as a Montero cap) is a type of cap formerly worn in Spain for hunting.  It has a spherical crown and (frequently fur-lined) flaps able to be drawn down to protect the ears and neck.

See also

References

Caps
Spanish clothing
Hunting equipment